Stefano Gaudenzi (born 27 September 1941) was a former tennis player, mainly specialized in doubles.

Biography
He won three bronze medals in doubles at the Summer Universiade from 1961 to 1967. He is the uncle of tennis player Andrea Gaudenzi.

Achievements

References

External links
 
 

1941 births
Living people
Italian male tennis players
Universiade medalists in tennis
Universiade bronze medalists for Italy
Medalists at the 1961 Summer Universiade
Medalists at the 1963 Summer Universiade
Medalists at the 1967 Summer Universiade
20th-century Italian people